Q60 may refer to:
 Q60 (motherboard)
 Q60 (New York City bus)
 Al-Mumtahanah, the 60th chapter of the Quran
 
 Infiniti Q60, an automobile
 Sierra Sky Park Airport, in Fresno County, California, United States